Guy Stern (born Günther Stern; January 14, 1922) is a German-American decorated member of the secret Ritchie Boys World War II military intelligence interrogation team. As the only person from his Jewish family to flee Nazi Germany, he came to the United States and later served in the US Army conducting frontline interrogations.

After World War II, he graduated from Columbia University and became a scholar, primarily of German and comparative literature. He now works at the Holocaust Memorial Center in Farmington Hills, Michigan.

Early life
Gunther Stern was born on January 14, 1922, the son of Julius Stern and Hedwig Stern (née Silberberg). He and his family, including a younger brother, Werner, and a younger sister, Eleonore, resided in Hildesheim, Germany. His father owned his own business, working as a salesman of clothing materials. Guy had a love for literature and music at a young age and would enjoy going to the theater and opera with his parents on the weekends.

As the Nazis came to power in Germany, Guy witnessed many changes in his town over the next few years. The Reichstag fire occurred and books and synagogues were burned. His school changed their teaching structure and propaganda became a part of instruction. He was also exiled from his sports club and taunted by many of his non-Jewish classmates.

Journey to America 
After witnessing the start of anti-Semitic policies under the Nazis, Guy's parents hatched a plan to send him to the United States to stay with his Uncle Benno and Aunt Ethel. His aunt and uncle had to ensure they had the finances to support him and that the affidavit would clear, meaning he would not become a public charge to the government. They did so by borrowing money from friends and returning it all after the record statements came through. To prepare for his trip, Guy's parents took him out of high school and hired an English tutor for him. With the help of an American-Jewish agency and a well-meaning consular official in Hamburg, Guy left Germany on November 5, 1937, and headed to St. Louis.

He lived with his aunt and uncle, cousin Melvin, and a refugee named Rudy from the Jewish Aid Society. Guy began his life in a new country by enrolling at Soldan High School and becoming a busboy at various hotels and cafes in the city. He became active in his school community, joining the newspaper team and even landing interviews with figures like Benny Goodman and Thomas Mann. Following Graduation, he began classes at a Jesuit institution, Saint Louis University, and started studying romance languages and German, working at a restaurant to cover costs.

Guy was also searching for someone wealthy and Jewish in St. Louis who could sign off on affidavits for his family. The closest he came was befriending an affluent gambler, but a lawyer denied their request due to the lack of a stable income. Ultimately, he was unable to secure passage overseas for the rest of his family.

The Ritchie Boys 

In 1942, Guy volunteered for naval intelligence, but was initially rejected because he was not born in the United States. He wanted to join the war effort in hopes of defeating the Nazis and reuniting with his family. He was later drafted in 1943, beginning weeks of basic training and legally changing his name from Gunther to Guy in case of capture by enemies. In 1944, he was sent to Camp Ritchie in Maryland, becoming a member of the Ritchie Boys, a special military intelligence unit composed of German, Austrian, and Czech refugees and immigrants to the United States, mostly of Jewish immigrants. There he studied enemy intelligence and different uniforms, memorized battle orders and aerial maps, and mostly learning how to conduct interrogations.

The four most useful interrogation tactics he learned were the power of knowledge, bribery, common interests, and invoking fear, all to be done without violating the Geneva Conventions on Warfare. They were taught to separate any emotional and private aspects they may come across during interrogations. After months of training, Guy and the other Ritchie Boys returned to Europe on D-Day, where he became a member of a six-man IPW (interrogators of prisoners of war) Team 41. After several successful interrogations, Guy was promoted to head of his team and prepared various reports based on answers from prisoners for his commanders. These ranged from the German railroad system to German preparations for chemical warfare.

Guy became close with another German-born interrogator, Fred Howard, and they formed new tactics to use like the 'good cop, bad cop' routine to scare prisoners of war and defectors. One of their most important interrogations included learning about the execution of 2 fellow Ritchie Boys of another team, leading to the capture and trial of their murderer. 

He earned the Bronze Star Medal for the intelligence he gathered during the war.

Post-War 

Once the war was over, Stern visited Hildesheim again where he learned that his family's home was taken by the Nazi government in 1938 and they were moved to a "Jew House". After talking to locals still in the area he learned they ended up at the Warsaw Ghetto and had perished there.

He moved back to New York City and went back to his studies, receiving a Bachelor of Arts in Romance languages in 1948 from Hofstra University, and then a Master of Arts in Germanistics in 1950 as well as a PhD in 1953 from Columbia University. After teaching at Columbia, he received an assistant professorship at Denison University in Ohio. He taught at the Seminarienhaus in Zürich in 1954 which was then owned by Ohio's Heidelberg University. He was later professor and head of the department for German language and literature at the University of Cincinnati in 1963. He was later head of the German and Slavic studies department at the University of Maryland, then until his retirement served as a distinguished professor of German literature and cultural history at Wayne State University and intermittently as senior vice president and provost. He was a visiting scholar at the German universities of Freiburg im Breisgau, Frankfurt am Main (1993), Leipzig (1997), Potsdam (1998) and Munich.

Stern is currently the director of the Harry and Wanda Zekelman International Institute of the Righteous at the Holocaust Memorial Center in Farmington Hills (near Detroit). He is one of the founders of the Lessing Society (University of Cincinnati, 1966), acting as its president from 1975 until 1977. As author and editor he published several books and compilations on German literary history, focusing mainly on literature on emigration and immigration. Some of these works include Essential German Grammar, War, Weimar, and Literature, and Literature and Culture in Exile. In 1998 he gave a lecture at the 60th anniversary of the Kristallnacht at the German parliament Bundestag in Bonn.

Stern has received several awards throughout his life, among them the Great Cross of Merit of the Federal Republic of Germany (1987) and the Goethe Medal (1989). He has also received an honorary doctorate from Hofstra University. He was named a Knight of the Legion of Honor by freeing France during the war and is recognized as an honorary citizen of Hildesheim. A plaque has been placed in front of the area that was once his home as tribute to his family.

He was married to a teacher named Judith who died in 2003 and is now married to the German author Susanna Piontek. He also had a son, who predeceased him.

He is one of the last surviving Ritchie Boys and turned 100 on January 14, 2022.

Selected works
 
 Fielding, Wieland, Goethe and the rise of the novel. Frankfurt am Main u.a. 2003.
 Literarische Kultur im Exil. Gesammelte Beiträge zur Exilforschung (1989 - 1997) . Dresden u.a. 1998.
 Literatur im Exil. Gesammelte Aufsätze 1959 – 1989. Ismaning 1989.
 (edited with Gustave Mathieu) 
 War, Weimar and literature. The story of the Neue Merkur, 1914-1925. University Park: Pennsylvania State University Press 1971.

References

Further reading

External links
Homepage of The Harry and Wanda Zekelman International Institute of the Righteous

Wayne State University: Guy Stern, WSU distinguished professor emeritus, to receive award from the Society for Contemporary American Literature in German in: ASKI (Ed.): Kulturberichte 1/99: Erinnerungen eines Zeitzeugen (German)

1922 births
Living people
20th-century American Jews
21st-century American Jews
Commanders Crosses of the Order of Merit of the Federal Republic of Germany
Jewish emigrants from Nazi Germany to the United States
German literary theorists
American literary theorists
People from Hildesheim
United States Army personnel of World War II
United States Army soldiers
Ritchie Boys
German centenarians
American centenarians
Men centenarians